Aqa Esmail (also Romanized as Āqā Esmā‘īl; also known as Āgh Esmā‘īl, Āgh Esmá”īl, and Agiswail) is a village in Zulachay Rural District, in the Central District of Salmas County, West Azerbaijan Province, Iran. At the 2006 census, its population was 306, in 76 families.

References 

Populated places in Salmas County